The 2019–20 season was Coventry City's 136th season in their existence, the club's second consecutive season in League One and their first at St Andrew's. Along with competing in League One, the club also competed in the FA Cup, EFL Cup and EFL Trophy.

The season covers the period from 1 July 2019 to 30 June 2020.

Preseason
The Sky Blues confirmed they will play Leamington, Northampton Town, AFC Telford United, Liverpool Under-23s and Swindon Town during their pre-season preparations.

Competitions

League One

League table

Results summary

Results by matchday

Matches
On 20 June 2019, the League One fixtures for the forthcoming season were announced.

FA Cup

The first round draw was made on 21 October 2019. The second round draw was made live on 11 November from Chichester City's stadium, Oaklands Park. The third round draw was made live on BBC Two from Etihad Stadium, Micah Richards and Tony Adams conducted the draw. The fourth round draw was made by Alex Scott and David O'Leary on Monday, 6 January.

EFL Cup

The first round draw was made on 20 June. The second round draw was made on 13 August 2019 following the conclusion of all but one first round matches.

EFL Trophy

On 9 July 2019, the pre-determined group stage draw was announced with Invited clubs to be drawn on 12 July 2019. The draw for the second round was made on 16 November 2019 live on Sky Sports.

Squad information

Squad details

* Player age and appearances/goals for the club as of beginning of 2019–20 season.

Appearances
Correct as of match played on 7 March 2020

Goalscorers
Correct as of match played on 7 March 2020

Assists
Correct as of match played on 7 March 2020

Yellow cards
Correct as of match played on 7 March 2020

Red cards
Correct as of match played on 7 March 2020

Captains
Correct as of match played on 7 March 2020

Penalties awarded

Suspensions served

Hat-tricks

Monthly & weekly awards

End-of-season awards

Transfers

Transfers in

Transfers out

Loans in

Loans out

References

External links
 Official Site
 BBC Sport – Club Stats
 Soccerbase – Results | Squad Stats | Transfers

Coventry City
Coventry City F.C. seasons